Ballyheather Halt railway station served Ballyheather, County Tyrone in Northern Ireland.

It was opened by the Donegal Railway Company on 1 February 1902. It closed on 1 January 1955.

References

Disused railway stations in County Tyrone
Railway stations opened in 1902
Railway stations closed in 1955
1902 establishments in Ireland
1955 disestablishments in Northern Ireland
Railway stations in Northern Ireland opened in the 20th century